This is a list of events that happened in 2013 in Mexico. The article also lists the most important political leaders during the year at both federal and state levels.

Incumbents

Federal government
President: Enrique Peña Nieto 

 Interior Secretary (SEGOB): Miguel Ángel Osorio Chong
 Secretary of Foreign Affairs (SRE): José Antonio Meade
Secretariat of Agriculture and Rural Development (SEGARPA): Enrique Martínez y Martínez 
Secretary of Agricultural, Territorial and Urban Development (SEDATU): Jorge Carlos Ramírez Marín 
 Communications Secretary (SCT): Gerardo Ruiz Esparza 
 Education Secretary (SEP): Emilio Chuayffet Chemor
 Secretary of Defense (SEDENA): Salvador Cienfuegos Cepeda
 Secretary of Navy (SEMAR): Vidal Francisco Soberón Sanz
 Secretary of Labor and Social Welfare: Alfonso Navarrete Prida
 Secretary of Welfare (SEDESOL): Rosario Robles
 Tourism Secretary (SECTUR): Claudia Ruiz Massieu
 Secretary of the Environment (SEMARNAT): Juan José Guerra Abud
 Secretary of Health (SALUD): Mercedes Juan López
Secretary of Finance and Public Credit (SHCP): Luis Videgaray Caso
Secretary of Economy (SE): Idelfonso Guajardo
Secretary of Energy (SENER): Pedro Joaquín Coldwell
Comisión Federal de Electricidad (CFE): Francisco Rojas Gutiérrez
Pemex: Emilio Lozoya
Attorney General (FGR): Jesús Murillo Karam
Chief of Staff: Aurelio Nuño Mayer
Coordinación de Comunicación Social de Presidencia (Coordination of Social Communication of the Presidency): David López Gutiérrez
Estado Mayor Presidencial (Presidential Security Staff): Rodolfo Miranda Moreno

Governors

 Aguascalientes: Carlos Lozano de la Torre 
 Baja California
José Guadalupe Osuna Millán , until October 31.
Francisco Vega de Lamadrid , starting November 1.
Baja California Sur: Marcos Covarrubias Villaseñor 
 Campeche: Fernando Ortega Bernés  
 Chiapas: Manuel Velasco Coello 
 Chihuahua: César Duarte Jáquez 
 Coahuila: Rubén Moreira Valdez 
 Colima: Mario Anguiano Moreno 
 Durango: Jorge Herrera Caldera  
 Guanajuato: Miguel Márquez Márquez 
 Guerrero: Ángel Aguirre Rivero 
 Hidalgo: Francisco Olvera Ruiz  
 Jalisco
Emilio González Márquez , until February 28
Aristóteles Sandoval , starting March 1 
 State of Mexico: Eruviel Ávila Villegas  
 Michoacán
Fausto Vallejo , until March 7 and from October 21
Jesús Reyna García, Interim governor from March 7 to October 21
 Morelos: Graco Ramírez .
 Nayarit: Roberto Sandoval Castañeda 
 Nuevo León: Rodrigo Medina de la Cruz 
 Oaxaca: Gabino Cué Monteagudo 
 Puebla: Rafael Moreno Valle Rosas 
 Querétaro: José Eduardo Calzada Rovirosa 
 Quintana Roo: Roberto Borge Angulo 
 San Luis Potosí: Fernando Toranzo Fernández 
 Sinaloa: Mario López Valdez 
 Sonora: Guillermo Padrés Elías 
 Tabasco: Arturo Núñez Jiménez , starting January 1
 Tamaulipas: Egidio Torre Cantú 		
 Tlaxcala: Mariano González Zarur 
 Veracruz: Javier Duarte de Ochoa 
 Yucatán: Rolando Zapata Bello 
 Zacatecas: Miguel Alonso Reyes 
Head of Government of the Federal District: Miguel Ángel Mancera

Events
 January
Clausura 2013 Copa MX (through April)
 1 – New Year's Day, civic holiday, Minimum wage increase of 3.9% (MXN $2.04)
 31 – Torre Ejecutiva Pemex explosion: Thirty-seven killed and 126 injured, followed by three days of mourning.
February
20 – 5.6 magnitude earthquake centered in Armería, Colima. No reorted damages or injuries.
National Institute of Statistics and Geography (INEGI) publishes figures indicating 3.9% economic growth during 2012 but warns of a possible deceleration of the economy in 2013.
 March
2013 Rally México
8 – Bank of Mexico (Banixco) cuts prime interest rates to 4.50%.
26 – Satmex 8 launched.
28 – First same-sex marriage performed in Oaxaca
April 21 – 5.8 magnitude earthquake centered in Michoacan causes blackouts in Mexico City but no reported injuries or other damages.
May
2 – United States President Barack Obama makes an official trip to Mexico.
7 – the 2013 Ecatepec de Morelos gas tanker explosion: Twenty-seven killed and at least 30 injured.
8 – The value of the peso increases and Mexico's Fitch Ratings increase from BBB to BBB+.
26 – Club America wins the 2012–13 Liga MX season.
 June –  Chactún, a Mayan ruin, is discovered in Campeche
July
7 – Elections in seven states.
23 – Chihuahua International Airport is closed because of flooding due to heavy rains.
 Hurricane Erick strikes Southwestern Mexico, Western Mexico and Baja California Sur
2013 Central American and Caribbean Championships in Athletics: Mexican men win 23 medals, women win 24.
2013 World Taekwondo Championships in Puebla: Mexico wins five medals. The men's team is ranked third and the women's is ranked ninth.
 August
25 – the 2013 Mexico train accident, at least five killed, at least 22 injured, mostly undocumented immigrants
31 – Miss Latin America 2013 in the Riviera Maya won by Julia Guerra of Brasil. Mexico's Fanny Barroso finishes third.
2013 Copa de México de Naciones in Aztec Stadium won by Argentina.
Hurricane Manuel strikes much of Mexico
 September
2 – President Peña gives his first annual message.**Hurricane Ingrid strikes
Banixco cuts its prime rate to 3.75%.
 October
5 – Chihuahua monster truck accident
19 – Nuestra Belleza México 2013, won by Josselyn Garciglia from Baja California Sur.
Hurricane Raymond strikes the southwestern coast 
 November
INEGI reports economic growth between 0.8% and 1.3% during the third trimester, avoiding recession.
Museo Jumex opens
December
19 – S&P Global Ratings increases Mexico credit rating to BBB+.
20 – The Senate approves partial privatization of the oil industry.

Anticipated
The SEGH-CFE 1 solar power array was expected to go online in 2013.

Awards

National Prize for Arts and Sciences
Physics, Mathematics, and Natural Sciences – Federico Bermúdez Rattoni, Magdaleno Medina Noyola
Technology and Design – Martín Ramón Aluja Schuneman Hofer
Fine arts – Javier Álvarez (composer), Ángela Gurría, Paul Leduc (film director)
Linguistics and literature – Hugo Gutiérrez Vega, Luis Fernando Lara Ramos
History, Social Sciences, and Philosophy – Roger Bartra, Carlos Martínez Assad
Popular Arts and Traditions – Narciso Lico Carrillo
Belisario Domínguez Medal of Honor – Manuel Gómez Morín (post mortem)
Order of the Aztec Eagle – Takashi Yamanouchi, Japanese businessperson
Ohtli Award
 Alberto M. Carvalho
 Henry Cisneros 
 Jesús "Chuy" García
 Lincoln Díaz-Balart
 José M. Hernández

Notable deaths
January 8 – Raúl Araiza, 77, actor, director, and producer (b. 1935)
January 31 – Rubén Bonifaz Nuño
February 19 – Joaquín Cordero
February 21 — Francisco José Madero González, accountant and politician (PRI); Governor of Coahuila in 1981
March 3 – Jaime Guadalupe González Domínguez
May 10 – Félix Agramont Cota, Mexican engineer and politician, 8th Governor of Baja California Sur (b. 1918)
May 26 – Héctor Garza
July 17 – Alberto López Bello
September 18 – Rafael Corkidi
October 15 – El Brazo (Juan Alvarado Nieves)
October 18 – Francisco Rafael Arellano Félix
November 15 – Karla Álvarez
December 11 – Javier Jauregui

See also 
 List of Mexican films of 2013

Notes

References

External links